James Pyke may refer to:

James Pyke (cricketer) (born 1966), Australian cricketer and SANFL footballer
James Pyke (rugby union) (1866–1941), English rugby international

See also
James Pike (disambiguation)